Guess (styled as GUESS or Guess?) is an American clothing brand and retailer, notable for its black-and-white advertisements. Guess licenses its brand on other fashion accessories, such as watches, jewelry, perfumes, bags and shoes.

History

Guess began in 1982 as a book of styles started by Georges, Maurice, Armand, and Paul Marciano. The brothers switched to selling jeans with a light, form-fitting denim and zippers at the ankles. Guess began offering licensed products, including watches, eyewear, and a fragrance line. In 1985, it introduced black-and-white advertisements, which went on to win numerous design awards. Its fashion models have included a number of supermodels, many of whom first achieved prominence via these ad campaigns. In the 1985 Robert Zemeckis movie, Back to the Future, Marty McFly (Michael J Fox) wore Guess's denim clothing, which was reportedly designed specifically for the film.

Georges had wanted to sell Guess products in only the more exclusive stores, such as Bloomingdale's, while the other brothers decided on a broader distribution strategy, which included discount stores. Georges continued to oppose the idea of marketing Guess products beyond luxury retail outlets, and different alliances formed within the company. Georges abruptly sold his stake in the company to his brothers in September, 1993 for $214.2 million. To finance the purchase, the remaining three brothers borrowed $210 million, and $105 million was still outstanding three years later. To raise money, the brothers took Guess public.

By the end of the decade, sales dropped and Guess reduced its expansion plans to concentrate on improving investment returns. On January 26, 2001, Guess Inc. restated previous results for fiscal year 2000 after writing down impaired inventory. In 2004, the accessories department was greatly expanded and several stores across the US were redesigned. Guess also created a lower priced collection sold exclusively through its outlet locations, and introduced its first brand extension, the upscale female line of clothing and accessories, named Marciano.

Guess continued its Guess Kids clothing line into the 2000s, and in 2006, began promoting the line through its factory retail stores. It continued to be guided by the Marciano brothers, as co-chairmen and co-CEOs. Maurice Marciano has overseen the design and its sales growth, while Paul managed the image and advertising. The company operates in many countries around the world with the majority of its stores located in the United States and Canada.

In 2012, 23 years after first posing for the brand, supermodel Claudia Schiffer posed again for Guess's 30th anniversary. In 2017, Camila Cabello was announced as the new face of Guess. As of 2018, Jennifer Lopez became the face of Guess.

Victor Herrero replaced Paul Marciano as CEO in August 2015. In February 2019, it was announced that Victor Herrero will be stepping down from his position as CEO with Carlos Alberini selected as his replacement.

Controversy

Sweatshop allegations
During the 1980s, Guess was accused of using underground sweatshop contractors in Los Angeles. Initially, the company threatened to close or move its operations in factories where employers complained of sweatshop practices. In 1992, Guess contractors faced litigation from the US Department of Labor (DOL) due to failure to pay their employees the minimum wage or adequate overtime. Rather than face a court case, $573,000 in back wages were paid to employees. The company also agreed to be subjected to a voluntary monitoring agreement with DOL to prevent sweatshop practices among its subcontractors. Guess earned a place on the labor department's 'Trendsetters List', but this position was suspended several years later in 1996 after independent inspectors found violations of regulations at seven of the company's contractors.

In the same year, the company was sued by the Union of Needletrades, Industrial and Textile Employees (UNITE), again due to the failure to pay the minimum wage or overtime to workers. The settlement, supervised by the US Department of Labor, saw the reinstatement of eight workers found to have been illegally fired and another $80,000 in back pay given to workers. Almost immediately after the settlement, Guess announced that it was moving its sewing production to Mexico. The company denied that the move was related to these court cases, but its public image continued to suffer.

Throughout the 1990s, UNITE continued a public relations campaign against Guess, focusing on the experiences of former employees. Billboards subsequently appeared in Las Vegas, Los Angeles, and New York City featuring a photograph of Rage Against the Machine with the caption "Rage Against Sweatshops: We Don't Wear Guess – A Message from Rage Against The Machine and UNITE. Injustice. Don't buy it." Eventually, Guess countered with a defamation suit against Unite and several of its officials, while in 1997 the company ran full-page ads in many major American newspapers claiming that its contractors were "guaranteed 100% free of sweatshop labour". The wording of these ads was changed after federal authorities complained that the claims had not been made by anyone in the government and had no official status.

"Ski Colombia" T-shirts
In 2005, Guess pulled a line of T-shirts from the market after Erika Becker-Medina, a D.C. area resident and government employee, spearheaded a campaign calling for the boycott of the company. "Ski Colombia: Always Plenty of Fresh Powder" was embossed on the T-shirts which were released by the company in the second quarter of 2005, apparently in reference to Colombia's drug-trafficking problem. Guess distributed letters of apology.

Gucci logo infringement 
In 2009, Italian luxury brand Gucci accused Guess of counterfeiting and trademark infringing the Gucci logo and the interlocking G's which appear on pairs of Guess shoes. In 2012, Gucci was awarded $4.7 million in damages; originally, the Italian brand had asked for $221 million.

Russian Operations 

Guess has refused to cease operations and investment in Russia following the 
Russian invasion of Ukraine (2022–present).

References

External links

 

Clothing brands of the United States
Clothing retailers of the United States
Jeans by brand
Retail companies based in California
Clothing companies based in Los Angeles
American companies established in 1981
Clothing companies established in 1981
1981 establishments in California
Labor disputes in California
Labor disputes in the United States
Watch manufacturing companies of the United States
Companies listed on the New York Stock Exchange
1980s fashion
1990s fashion
2000s fashion